The Death of Marat ( or Marat Assassiné) is a 1793 painting by Jacques-Louis David depicting the artist's friend and murdered French revolutionary leader, Jean-Paul Marat. One of the most famous images from the era of the French Revolution, David painted it when he was the leading French Neoclassical painter, a Montagnard, and a member of the revolutionary Committee of General Security. Created in the months after Marat's death, the painting shows Marat lying dead in his bath after his murder by Charlotte Corday on 13 July 1793. Art historian T. J. Clark called David's painting the first modernist work for "the way it took the stuff of politics as its material, and did not transmute it".

The painting is in the collection of the Royal Museum of Fine Arts of Belgium. A replica, created by the artist's studio, is on display at the Louvre.

The assassination of Marat
Jean-Paul Marat (24 May 1743 – 13 July 1793) was one of the leaders of the Montagnards, a radical faction active during the French Revolution from the Reign of Terror to the Thermidorian Reaction. Marat was stabbed to death by Charlotte Corday, a Girondin and political enemy of Marat who blamed Marat for the September Massacre. Corday gained entrance to Marat's dwelling with a note promising details about a counter-revolutionary ring in Caen.

Marat suffered from a skin condition that caused him to spend much of his time in his bathtub; he would often work there. Corday fatally stabbed Marat, but she did not attempt to flee. She was later tried and executed for the murder.

When he was murdered, Marat was correcting a proof of his newspaper L'Ami du peuple. The blood stained page is preserved.  In the painting, the note Marat is holding is not an actual quotation of Corday, but a fictional expression based on what Corday might have said.

David's politics 
The leading French painter of his generation, David was a prominent Montagnard and a Jacobin, aligned with Marat and Maximilian Robespierre.  As a deputy of the museum section at the National Convention, David voted for the death of French king Louis XVI and served on the Committee of General Security, where he actively participated in sentencings and imprisonment, eventually presiding over the "section des interrogatoires". David was also on the Committee of Public Instruction.

Style

The Death of Marat has often been compared to Michelangelo's Pietà, a major similarity being the elongated arm hanging down in both works. David admired Caravaggio's works, especially Entombment of Christ, which mirrors The Death of Marat'''s drama and light.

David sought to transfer the sacred qualities long associated with the monarchy and the Catholic Church to the new French Republic. He painted Marat, martyr of the Revolution, in a style reminiscent of a Christian martyr, with the face and body bathed in a soft, glowing light.

 Later history 

Several copies of the painting were made by David's pupils in 1793–1794, when the image was a popular symbol of martyrdom amid the Reign of Terror.   From 1795 to David's death, the painting languished in obscurity.  During David's exile in Belgium, it was hidden, somewhere in France, by Antoine Gros, David's most famous pupil. 

There was renewed interest in the painting after Pierre-Joseph Proudhon and Charles Baudelaire praised the work after seeing it at the Bazar Bonne-Nouvelle in 1845. In the 20th century, David's painting inspired several artists (including Pablo Picasso, Edvard Munch, and Paul Jacques Aimé Baudry), poets (Alessandro Mozzambani) and writers (Peter Weiss' play Marat/Sade).  Brazilian artist Vik Muniz created a version composed of contents from a city landfill as part of his "Pictures of Garbage" series.

The letter that appears in the painting, with bloodstains and bath water marks still visible, has survived and is owned by Robert Lindsay, 29th Earl of Crawford.

 In popular culture 

 In 1897, the French director Georges Hatot made a movie entitled La Mort de Marat. This early silent film made for the Lumière Company is a brief single-shot scene of the assassination of the revolutionary. 
In Vladimir Nabokov's novel Lolita (1955), the main protagonist Humbert Humbert, explains his feelings "like Marat but with no white-necked maiden to stab me" 
 The composition influenced one of the scenes in Stanley Kubrick's 1975 adaptation of Barry Lyndon.
 The cover art of the 1980 album East by Australian pub rock band Cold Chisel, was inspired by the painting.
 Andrzej Wajda's 1983 film Danton includes several scenes in David's atelier, including one showing the painting of Marat's portrait.
 Derek Jarman's 1986 film Caravaggio imitates the painting in a scene where the chronicler, head bound in a towel (but writing here with a typewriter), slouches back in his tub, one arm extended outside the tub.
 Vik Muniz recreated the Death of Marat with waste from a massive landfill near Rio de Janeiro in his 2010 documentary Waste Land. The picture is prominently featured on the DVD cover.
 Steve Goodman re-created the painting (with himself in place of Marat) for the cover of his 1977 album Say It in Private.
 The painting is recreated in The Red Violin (1998), in the scene when Jason Flemyng, playing violinist Frederick Pope, leans back in a bathtub with a letter from his lover in his hand.
 In the 2002 movie, About Schmidt, Jack Nicholson's character Warren falls asleep in the bath whilst composing a letter, recreating David's painting.
 The painting was used as the album art for American band Have a Nice Life's 2008 album Deathconsciousness.
 The painting was used as the album art for American band The New Regime’s 2008 album  Coup.
 In the 23 October 2008, episode of CSI: Crime Scene Investigation (Season 9, Episode 3 - "Art Imitates Life") a serial killer poses his victims peculiarly, one such victim's posture being an homage to David's painting.
 In 2013, it was gender-swapped with Lady Gaga in Marat's spot for ARTPOP. MTV
 In the 2014 video game Assassin's Creed Unity, Arno Dorian investigates the death of Jean-Paul Marat, bringing Charlotte Corday to justice. The body of Jean-Paul is as given in the painting by Jacques-Louis David.
 The painting was mentioned as a favorite of the narrator in the novel My Year of Rest and Relaxation by Ottessa Moshfegh
 The painting is referenced by US alternative rock band R.E.M. in the lyrics of their song "We Walk" and in the video to their song "Drive".
 The cover art to singer-songwriter Andrew Bird's 2019 album My Finest Work Yet features a recreation of the painting with Bird in place of Marat.

 Footnotes 

 Bibliography 
T J Clark, "Painting in the Year Two", in Representations, No. 47, Special Issue: National Cultures before Nationalism (Summer, 1994), pp. 13–63.
 Thibaudeau, M.A., Vie de David, Bruxelles (1826)
 Delécluze, E., Louis David, son école et son temps, Paris, (1855) re-edition Macula (1983) – First-hand testimony by a pupil of David
 David, J.L., Le peintre Louis David 1748–1825. Souvenirs & Documents inédits par J.L. David son Petit-Fils, ed. Victor Havard, Paris (1880)
 Holma, Klaus, David. Son évolution, son style, Paris (1940)
 Adhé mar Jean, David. Naissance du génie d'un peintre, ed. Raoul Solar, Paris (1953)
 Bowman, F.P., 'Le culte de Marat, figure de Jésus', Le Christ romantique, ed. Droz, Genève, pp. 62 sq. (1973)
 Wildenstein, Daniel et Guy, Documents complémentaires au catalogue de l’oeuvre de Louis David, Paris, Fondation Wildenstein (1973) – fondamental source to track all influences constituting David's visual culture
 Starobinski, Jean, 1789, les emblèmes de la raison, ed. Flammarion, Paris (1979)
 Schnapper, Antoine, David témoin de son temps, ed. Office du Livre, Fribourg (1980)
 Kruft, H.-W., "An antique model for David's Marat" in The Burlington Magazine CXXV, 967 (October 1983), pp. 605–607; CXXVI, 973 (April 84)
 Traeger, Jorg, Der Tod des Marat: Revolution des menschenbildes, ed. Prestel, München (1986)
 Thévoz, Michel, Le théâtre du crime. Essai sur la peinture de David, éd. de Minuit, Paris (1989)
 Guilhaumou, J., La mort de Marat, ed. Complexe, Bruxelles (1989)
 Mortier, R., 'La mort de Marat dans l'imagerie révolutionnaire', Bulletin de la Classe des Beaux-Arts, Académie Royale de Belgique, 6ème série, tome I, 10–11 (1990), pp. 131–144
 Simon, Robert, "David’s Martyr-Portrait of Le Peletier de Saint-Fargeau and the conundrums of Revolutionary Representation" in Art History, vol.14, n°4 (December 1991), pp. 459–487
 Sérullaz, Arlette, Inventaire général des dessins. Ecole française. Dessins de Jacques-Louis David 1748–1825, Paris (1991)
 David contre David, actes du colloque au Louvre du 6–10 décembre 1989, éd. R. Michel, Paris (1993) [M. Bleyl, "Marat : du portrait à la peinture d'histoire"]
 Malvone, Laura, "L'Évènement politique en peinture. A propos du Marat de David" in Mélanges de l'École française de Rome. Italie et Méditerranée, n° 106, 1 (1994)
 Pacco, M., De Vouet à David. Peintures françaises du Musée d'Art Ancien, XVIIe et XVIIIe siècles, ed. MRBAB, Bruxelles (1994)
 Hofmann, Werner, Une époque en rupture 1750–1830, Gallimard, Paris (1995)
 Crow, T., Emulation. Making artists for Revolutionary France, ed. Yale University Press, New Haven London (1995)
 Monneret, Sophie, David et le néoclassicisme, ed. Terrail, Paris (1998)
 Robespierre, edited by Colin Haydon & William Doyle, Cambridge (1999)
 Lajer-Burcharth, E., Necklines. The art of Jacques-Louis David after the Terror, ed. Yale University Press, New Haven London (1999)
 Lee, S., David, ed. Phaidon, London (1999); * Aston, Nigel, Religion and Revolution in France, 1780–1804, McMillan, London (2000)
 Jacques-Louis David’s Marat, edited by William Vaughan & Helen Weston, Cambridge (2000)
 Rosenberg, Pierre & Louis-Antoine Prat, Jacques-Louis David 1748–1825. Catalogue raisonné des dessins, 2 volumes, éd. Leonardo Arte, Milan (2002)
 Idem, Peronnet, Benjamin, "Un album inédit de David", Revue de l’Art, n°142, (2003–2004) pp. 45–83
 Coquard, Olivier, "Marat assassiné. Reconstitution abusive" in Historia Mensuel, n°691 (juillet 2004)
 Vanden Berghe, Marc & Ioana Plesca, Nouvelles perspectives sur la Mort de Marat: entre modèle jésuite et références mythologiques, Bruxelles (2004) / New perspectives for David's Death of Marat, Brussels (2004), available at the KBR, Brussels.
 Idem, Lepeletier de Saint-Fargeau sur son lit de mort par Jacques Louis-David : saint Sébastien révolutionnaire, miroir multiréférencé de Rome, Brussels (2005), available at the KBR, Brussels.
 Sainte-Fare Garnot, N., Jacques-Louis David 1748–1825, Paris, Ed. Chaudun (2005)
 Johnson, Dorothy, Jacques-Louis David: New Perspectives, University of Delaware Press (2006)
 Guilhaumou, Jacques, La mort de Marat (2006) revolution-francaise.net
 Plume de Marat – Plumes sur Marat, pour une bibliographie générale, (Chantiers Marat, vol. 9–10), Editions Pôle Nord, Bruxelles (2006)
 Angelitti, Silvana, "La Morte di Marat e la Pietà di Michelangelo" in La propaganda nella storia, sl, (sd), e-torricelli.it
 Pesce, Luigi, Marat assassinato : il tema del braccio della morte : realismo caravagesco e ars moriendi in David'', s.ed., sl, (2007) best glowing tips

1793 paintings
1793 events of the French Revolution
Paintings by Jacques-Louis David
Collections of the Royal Museums of Fine Arts of Belgium
Paintings about death
Cultural depictions of Jean-Paul Marat